Radovanović is a surname derived from a masculine given name Radovan.

It may refer to:

 Aleksa Radovanović (1900–2004), Salonika front veteran
 Bojana Radovanović (born 2005), Serbian singer
 Branko Radovanović (born 1981), Serbian footballer
 Drinka Radovanović (born 1943), Serbian sculptor
 Igor Radovanović (born 1985), Bosnian footballer
 Ivan Radovanović (born 1988), Serbian footballer
 Luka Radovanović (c. 1425–1502), Ragusan priest and printer
 Marijana Radovanović (born 1972), Serbian singer known as Maja Marijana
 Mirko Radovanović (born 1986), Serbian footballer
 Ninoslav Radovanović (born 1940), Serbian cardiac surgeon
 Pavle Radovanović (born 1975), Montenegrin football referee
 Ratko Radovanović (born 1956), Bosnian Serb former basketball player
 Slavko Radovanović (born 1962), Yugoslav former footballer
 Soni Radovanovic (born 1988), Serbian rugby league player
 Srđan Radovanović (born 1959), Serbian lawyer and business executive
 Vanja Radovanović (born 1982), Montenegrin singer
 Vujadin Radovanović (born 1962), Serbian comic-book and graphic novel creator

Serbian surnames
Croatian surnames
Patronymic surnames
Surnames from given names